Patrick McDonald was a Republican member of the Idaho House of Representatives, representing the Boise-based District 15 from January 2014 to January 2019. He was appointed to the position by Governor Butch Otter to serve the remainder of the term of Mark Patterson, who resigned due to scandal regarding his past criminal record.

Background
McDonald was an officer with the Idaho State Police for 33 years, last serving as a regional patrol commander. He also served as a United States Marshal for Idaho during the George W. Bush administration.

Elections

References

Year of birth missing (living people)
Idaho State University alumni
Living people
Republican Party members of the Idaho House of Representatives
United States Marshals
People from Burley, Idaho
Politicians from Salt Lake City
21st-century American politicians